Ziemke is a surname. Notable people with the surname include:

Cindy Ziemke, American politician
Earl F. Ziemke (1922–2007), American military historian

See also
Zemke
Ziem
Zierke